The Fives–Hirson railway is a double tracked electrified railway line linking Lille-Flandres with Hirson.

History
The line opened in stages:
Aulnoye to Hirson, 30 October 1869
Lille to Gare de Valenciennes, 22 June 1870
Valenciennes to Aulnoye, 1 September 1872

Infrastructure
Electrification was complete by 1958. The line uses automatic block signalling (BAL, Bloc Automatique Lumineux).

References

Railway lines in Hauts-de-France
Standard gauge railways in France
Railway lines opened in 1869